Julio Alberto Temístocles Baylon Aragonés (10 September 1950 – 9 February 2004) was a Peruvian footballer who played as a right winger.

Club career
Baylon was born in Pisco. From 1978 to 1980, He played for the Rochester Lancers of the North American Soccer League (NASL) as well as nine games for the New York Arrows of the Major Indoor Soccer League.

International career
Baylón made 32 appearances for the Peru national team.

Personal life
He is the father of Jair Baylon and uncle of Sandro Baylon.

References

External links

1950 births
2004 deaths
People from Pisco, Peru
Association football wingers
Peruvian footballers
Peru international footballers
Peruvian expatriate footballers
Expatriate footballers in Germany
Peruvian expatriate sportspeople in Germany
1970 FIFA World Cup players
Club Alianza Lima footballers
FC 08 Homburg players
SC Fortuna Köln players
Rochester Lancers (1967–1980) players
North American Soccer League (1968–1984) players
Bundesliga players
2. Bundesliga players